"I Threw It All Away" is a song by American singer-songwriter Bob Dylan. The track appeared on Dylan's album Nashville Skyline in 1969, and was released as its first single later that year, where it reached number 85 on the Billboard Hot 100, and number 30 on the UK Singles Chart. It is considered to be one of the best and most popular songs on the album.

Music and lyrics
"I Threw It All Away" was one of the first songs written for Nashville Skyline and one of only two new songs that were definitely written prior to the recording sessions ("Lay Lady Lay" being the other).  Dylan played the song for George Harrison and his wife Pattie in November 1968, and Harrison was apparently impressed enough with the song to learn it himself.  It was the second song recorded for Nashville Skyline, after "To Be Alone with You", on February 13, 1969.

Dylan is singing about a love that he has lost by being cruel and angry. There has been some speculation on whom Dylan is referring to in the song. Many have speculated that it could be about a number of women including Suze Rotolo, Joan Baez, and Edie Sedgwick.

Unlike many songs Dylan wrote about failed relationships, such as "Don't Think Twice, It's All Right", "It Ain't Me, Babe" and "One of Us Must Know (Sooner or Later)", Dylan takes responsibility for the failure in this song.  The song has also been interpreted as a portrait of Dylan's muse.

Personnel
Bob Dylan - guitar, vocals
Kenneth A. Buttrey - drums
Charlie Daniels - bass guitar
Bob Wilson - organ

Critical reception and legacy
Australian singer-songwriter Nick Cave cited it in a 1995 interview as the one song he "wished he had written".

In a 2005 poll reported in Mojo, "I Threw It All Away" was listed as the #55 all time Bob Dylan song.  In 2002, Uncut listed "I Threw It All Away" as the #34 all time Bob Dylan song.

Benjamin Booker and Laura Marling both cited it as their favorite Dylan song in a 2021 Stereogum article. Booker wrote, "I rarely get a glimpse of the man behind the songs. But, on 'I Threw It All Away' I think he’s looking us straight in the eye. That’s why I love this song. The notorious Casanova who threw everything he had into becoming a legend had made it, but not without regrets". Marling noted, "It just feels like he opens up and shows this super vulnerable side and lets his voice soar like I haven’t really heard before. And it’s so sincere. I’d give him another chance if I was the one he was singing to, that’s for sure".

Live performances
Dylan performed "I Threw It All Away" live for the first time on The Johnny Cash Show, broadcast on June 7, 1969.  It was the second song in Dylan's set with The Band at the Isle of Wight Festival on August 31, 1969 and is included on Isle of Wight Live, part of the 4-CD deluxe edition of The Bootleg Series Vol. 10: Another Self Portrait (1969–1971), released in 2013. (Another song from Nashville Skyline, "Lay Lady Lay", was also in Dylan's Isle of Wight set.)

Dylan performed "I Threw It All Away" in the spring of 1976 during the Rolling Thunder Revue. The May 16, 1976 performance would later be included on the live album Hard Rain.  The Rolling Thunder rendition of the song was a raging rock song with strident lyrics, in contrast to the original version.

Dylan also played the song on his 1978 tour, but did not play it again live until 1998 during his Never Ending Tour.  By 2002, the date of its final performances on the Never Ending Tour, Dylan was playing an acoustic version of the song. According to his official website, Dylan played the song a total of 48 times in concert.

Notable covers
Cher, on the 1969 album 3614 Jackson Highway
The Beatles (George Harrison), during the Let It Be sessions. Harrison also recorded a version of "Mama, You Been On My Mind" in the same medley.
Elvis Costello, on the 1995 album Kojak Variety'''
Prairie Oyster, on the 2006 album One KissYo La Tengo, on the 1989 album President Yo La Tengo''
Chris Cornell, performed the song during his Acoustic Higher Truth World Tour. Notably he performed it on 11/7/2015 at Cullen Performance Hall at the University of Houston.

References

External links
 Lyrics at Bob Dylan's official site
 Chords at Dylanchords

Songs written by Bob Dylan
Bob Dylan songs
Cher songs
Elvis Costello songs
Prairie Oyster songs
Scott Walker (singer) songs
1969 singles
Song recordings produced by Bob Johnston
Columbia Records singles
1969 songs